Boyukshor, also spelled separately Boyuk Shor (in translation refers to "Big Salty") is the second largest lake of Azerbaijan and largest on Absheron Peninsula. It is located in the center of the Absheron peninsula, on the boundaries of Binagadi, Sabunchu and Narimanov raions of the city of Baku.

Overview
According to geological data, the average depth of the water in the lake is 3.40-3.95 meters; the maximum depth is 4.20 meters. The shoreline depth ranges from 0.50 to 1.70 meters. The lake is in oval shape and its length from the northwestern to southeastern bank is about 10 km whilst the maximum width is 1.5-2.0 km. The lake feeds from the underground waters and completely contained from any rivers. The lake surface is 1,300 hectares and the volume is 45 million cm3.

Ecology
The ecological situation of the lake is in a bad state. It is polluted with waste from surrounding businesses. According to the Ministry of Ecology, about 18 thousand m3 of industrial and communal waste is disposed to the lake. One of the main sources of pollution is the oil waste waters from oil exploration and production boom of the 1930s. The first oil storage reservoir was built near the lake in 1866. In 2004, the ecological state of the lake was placed in extremely poor category. Additionally, the construction works which started with drying out of the lake caused more pollution for the residents of the area. The strong winds of Baku create dust from the sand transported to the lake location to dry the lake. Expert have also alleged that while dehydrating the lake, sediments spread by the wind will cause more ecological problems.

Construction of entertainment complex
In the 2000s, the Baku authorities prepared a plan for construction of a big entertainment complex on the place of the Boyuk Shor lake. The lake is planned to be dried out and set of parks and buildings be constructed on its territory. The first stage of the project plans to consume 128 hectares of the territory with 70% to be composed of soil and 30% of a yet to be created clean artificial lake. It will include an entertainment park, sports and resort facilities and gardens. Azerbaijan's Oil Museum, Azerbaijani Tea and Azerbaijani Wines museums are proposed to be built as well. A new mall on 4.5 hectares will be built too. The main entrance to the park will be from the Boyuk Shor Highway (known as the "airport highway") Close to the entrance, "Children's World" complex will be constructed. It will include a movie theater, concert hall, cafe, a zoo (14 ha), attractions park (10 ha). The center of the complex will have an artificial lake with small boats tours, a  waterfall. The complex will also include a  railroad for kids.

References

External links
Lake Boyukshor - satellite image
Böyük Şor gölünün ərazisində tikiləcək Bakı Əyləncə-İdman Kompleksi paytaxtın ən möhtəşəm memarlıq incilərindən biri olacaq image of the new parks complex to be built
 Böyükşor gölünün ekoloji vəziyyətinin yaxşılaşdırılması, mühafizəsi və istifadəsi sahəsində əlavə tədbirlər haqqında Azərbaycan Respublikası Prezidentinin 26 dekabr 2013-cü il tarixli, 61 saylı Fərmanı (azerb.)

Lakes of Azerbaijan
Geography of Baku